The Fubon Aozihdi Development Project is an under-construction skyscraper complex located in Gushan District, Kaohsiung, Taiwan. Upon completion, it will be the third-tallest building in Kaohsiung and the eighth-tallest in Taiwan. Construction of the complex began on May 13, 2021, and it is expected to be completed in 2025.

The project will create a commercial complex integrating shopping malls, a hotel, office spaces and an aquarium. The architectural design is designed by Mitsubishi Land.

See also 
 List of tallest buildings in Taiwan
 List of tallest buildings in Kaohsiung
 Fubon Xinyi A25

References 

Buildings and structures under construction in Taiwan
Skyscraper office buildings in Kaohsiung
Gushan District